The United Nations Interim Force in Lebanon, or UNIFIL, is a UN peacekeeping mission established on 19 March 1978 by United Nations Security Council Resolutions 425 and 426, to confirm Israeli withdrawal from Lebanon which Israel had invaded five days prior, in order to ensure that the government of Lebanon would restore its effective authority in the area. The 1978 South Lebanon conflict came in the context of Palestinian insurgency in South Lebanon and the Lebanese Civil War.

The mandate had to be adjusted twice, due to the Israeli invasion of Lebanon in 1982 and after the Israeli withdrawal from Lebanon in 2000. Following the 2006 Lebanon War, the United Nations Security Council enhanced UNIFIL and decided that in addition to the original mandate, it would, among other things, monitor the cessation of hostilities; accompany and support the Lebanese Armed Forces as they deploy throughout the south of Lebanon; and extend its assistance to help ensure humanitarian access to civilian populations and the voluntary and safe return of displaced persons.

UNIFIL's mandate is renewed annually by the United Nations Security Council; it was most recently extended on 31 August 2022 with the passing of United Nations Security Council Resolution 2650. It is composed of 10,000 peacekeepers from 46 nations, tasked with helping the Lebanese Army keep the south of the country protected. Its funding is approved on an annual basis by the General Assembly. It had a budget of $474 million for the period July 2018 to June 2019.

Mandate 

According to its Mandate, established by United Nations Security Council Resolutions 425 and 426 in 1978, UNIFIL is tasked with the following objectives:
 confirm the withdrawal of Israeli forces from southern Lebanon
 restore international peace and security
 assist the Government of Lebanon in ensuring the return of its effective authority in the area.

In addition, several further Security Council resolutions have reaffirmed the mission's mandate, including:
 31 January 2006: SC Resolution 1655
 31 July 2006: SC Resolution 1697
 11 August 2006: SC Resolution 1701.

History

The first UNIFIL troops deployed in the area on 23 March 1978 were reassigned from other UN peacekeeping operations in the area (United Nations Emergency Force, the United Nations Truce Supervision Organization, and the United Nations Disengagement Observer Force Zone). They were deployed after Israel launched Operation Litani earlier in the month, in response to a cross border raid by Palestinians based in Lebanon. UNIFIL made its headquarters in Naqoura close to the Lebanese-Israeli border. The majority of the force's initial personnel were provided by Canada, Iran and Sweden with support from France, Nepal and Norway. The initial force was established at 4,000 troops, but this was increased to 6,000 in May 1978. Israeli forces withdrew from the area on 13 June 1978, after which South Lebanon Army (SLA) forces under Saad Haddad remained in the area. UNIFIL began patrolling operations and established a series of positions including checkpoints, roadblocks and observation posts.   Nevertheless, UNIFIL operations during this time were hindered by restrictions that were imposed on its freedom of movement and a lack of co-operation by all parties to the conflict. There were also several attacks on its personnel, including ambushes, kidnappings, shelling and sniping. As a result, only limited progress was made in fulfilment of its mandate between 1978 and 1982. During the occupation, UNIFIL's function was mainly to provide humanitarian aid amidst the Lebanese Civil War.

Lebanese Civil War (until 1990) 

Prior to the 1982 Lebanon War, on 2 January 1982 two Ghanaian soldiers guarding a UNIFIL position were attacked by unidentified persons and one of the soldiers was shot and subsequently died. In February 1982, the force was increased by a further 1,000 troops. During the 1982 Lebanon War, commencing on 6 June 1982, Israeli forces advanced into south Lebanon. Despite being ordered to block the advance, the UN positions were either bypassed or overrun, primarily by the SLA forces under Saad Haddad. This was the main Lebanese paramilitary force supported by the Israel Defense Forces (IDF) in Southern Lebanon. The UN force was overwhelmed within a day. At least one Norwegian peacekeeper was killed in the initial attack. Following this, UNIFIL focused primarily on the distribution of aid and medical support, while a new force, the Multinational Force in Lebanon assumed primacy, being deployed in Beirut until being withdrawn in March 1984.

South Lebanon conflict (until 2000)
Beginning in 1985, Israel scaled back its permanent positions in Lebanon, although the IDF maintained some forces in Southern Lebanon, along with the SLA, to establish a security zone to prevent attacks on Israel from Lebanon. These forces were engaged by several groups, including Hezbollah.

UNIFIL's role during this time was limited to mainly manning checkpoints and undertaking patrols, as its operations were constrained by the Israeli security zone in the south. Its personnel were attacked by elements on both sides of the conflict during this time, and financial issues also hampered UNIFIL operations as some UN member states withheld funding for the operation. In 1986, the force was reorganised when France decreased its contribution to UNIFIL. There was a proposal to convert the force into a observation group around this time, although this was ultimately rejected.

The period saw an Israel invasion in the 1982 and another on a smaller scale in 1993. In 1996 south Lebanon was bombarded by the Israeli army, airforce and navy for seventeen days. According to Amnesty International during the 1996 bombardment UNIFIL compounds and vehicles came under Israeli aircraft or artillery fire 270 times. This included the shelling of the Fijian UNIFIL compound near Qana where 102 villagers sheltering were killed. In April 2000, Israel notified the UN Secretary General that it was withdrawing from south Lebanon. This process was completed by June 2000. After this, UNIFIL was able to resume its military tasks along the "Blue Line" (the UN identified line of withdrawal for the IDF) and the adjacent areas, where UNIFIL sought to maintain the ceasefire through patrols, observation from fixed positions, and close contact between Lebanese Armed Forces (LAF), as well as providing humanitarian assistance to the local population.

Conflict in 2006 

According to UNIFIL press releases, there have been dozens of such incidents of UN posts coming under fire during the 2006 Lebanon War. In his 21 July 2006 report about the UNIFIL activities 21 January – 18 July 2006, the Secretary-General of the United Nations Kofi Annan stated that "Some Hezbollah positions remained in close proximity to United Nations positions, especially in the Hula area, posing a significant security risk to United Nations personnel and equipment."

Combat-related incidents 

On 17 July, a UNIFIL international staff member and his wife were killed when Israeli aircraft bombed the Hosh District of Tyre, Lebanon.
 On 23 July, Hezbollah fire wounded an Italian observer.
 On 25 July, Hezbollah opened small arms fire at a UNIFIL convoy, forcing it to retreat.
 On 25 July, four soldiers from the Ghanaian battalion were lightly injured after an Israeli tank shell hit a UNIFIL position during fighting in Southern Lebanon on 24 July 2006.
 Shrapnel from tank shells fired by the IDF seriously wounded an Indian soldier on 16 July 2006.
 On 25 July 2006 four UNTSO observers from Austria, Canada, China and Finland were killed by Israeli strikes on an OGL (Observer Group Lebanon) patrol base near Khiam in southern Lebanon. According to the UN, the Israelis stated they were responding to "Hezbollah fire from that vicinity" and the four had taken shelter in a bunker under the post. The area around the site was hit by a precision guided bomb from an Israeli jet and shelled a total of 14 times by Israeli artillery throughout the day despite warning calls made by UN personnel to the IDF. However, General Alain Pellegrini, then commander of UNIFIL, claims that he attempted to call Israeli officials "five or six times", but never got past their secretaries. Later, Israeli artillery shelling resumed as a rescue team tried to clear the rubble.
 On 29 July, two Indian soldiers were wounded when their post was damaged during an Israeli airstrike in Southern Lebanon.
 On 6 August, a Hezbollah rocket hit the headquarters of the Chinese UNIFIL contingent, wounding three Chinese soldiers.
 On 12 August, a Ghanaian soldier was wounded when Israeli artillery shelled the area near the village of Haris.

From August 2006

Visit by Secretary-General 
In order to stress the importance of implementing Security Council resolution 1701, UN Secretary-General Annan himself paid a visit to UNIFIL on the ground in August 2006.

Reinforcements 

By July 2006, UNIFIL's strength had dropped to its lowest, with only 1,980 personnel deployed. However, following the cease-fire, UNIFIL received a large number of reinforcements, up to 15,000 men, and heavy equipment. France committed to increase her complement from 400 to 2,000 men and send Leclerc heavy tanks and AMX 30 AuF1 self-propelled artillery, in addition to the forces deployed in Opération Baliste. Italy committed to deploy 3,000 troops, while Qatar offered to send between 200 and 300 troops. As the French were preparing to deploy, French commander of UNIFIL Alain Pellegrini and the country's foreign minister, Philippe Douste-Blazy, stated that France would not intervene to disarm Hezbollah.

A naval component of UNIFIL was set up to assist the Lebanese Navy as an interim measure to prevent arms proliferation to Hezbollah while the Lebanese Navy builds its capacity. For a period the force was German-led under the command of a German admiral before handing over to the Italians.

The Indonesian contingent received 12 VAB (Véhicule de l'Avant Blindé) on 17 February 2007, as the part of the second wave of shipments from the agreement between the French and Indonesian governments. Among the equipment sent with the second wave of VABs were 10 tool boxes (pioneering equipment), 10 armored vehicle radio communications units, HMG (Heavy Machine Gun) shooter shields, and 40 water jerrycans.

On 16 March 2009, KRI Diponegoro, an Indonesian  joined the UNIFIL Naval Task Force. In August 2010, two Indonesian soldiers were criticized after they escaped from clashes between Israel and Lebanon by fleeing in a taxi.

The Israeli Ambassador to the UN, Ambassador Dan Gillerman, met with UNIFIL commander, Maj.-Gen. Claudio Graziano, on 15 August 2008, after Israel was accused of unilaterally violating United Nations Security Council Resolution 1701 by the almost daily overflights of Lebanese airspace, the continued occupation of the village of Ghajar, and Israel's refusal to submit maps of areas on which it dropped cluster munitions during the 2006 Lebanese war.

Following the war, British military historian John Keegan predicted that Israel would in the future invade Lebanon and continue attacking until Hezbollah's system of tunnels and bunkers was completely destroyed, as Israel would not tolerate a "zone of invulnerability" occupied by a sworn enemy, or a double threat posed by Hezbollah and Hamas rockets, and that Israel might first attack the Gaza Strip. Keegan noted that any IDF entry into Southern Lebanon would risk provoking a clash with UNIFIL, but that it is unlikely to deter Israel, as it tends to behave with "extreme ruthlessness" when national survival is at stake.

In 2010, a series of standoffs and clashes erupted between UNIFIL troops and Lebanese villagers in the border region. Villagers accused French peacekeepers of provocative and intrusive patrols, and of taking pictures of people inside their homes. People of Aitaroun town, Marjayoun, accused the French regiments of driving their heavy vehicles through their two-month-old tobacco fields, which support many families. UNIFIL was also accused of having stepped up its patrols and of failing to coordinate with the Lebanese Army. In July 2010, the most serious incident occurred when the French regiments decided to carry out exercises unilaterally, without Lebanese units or other regiments. When they went into narrow alleys of Lebanese villages some residents first tried to redirect them out of their private areas. The French fired against the civilians, arrested a youth driving a motorcycle, and destroyed the vehicle. When other civilians saw that, they surrounded and attacked the UNIFIL French troops without any weapons. The vehicles' windows were smashed by stones from dozens of civilians of all ages, and the French commander was wounded. The French troops were forcibly disarmed by the villagers, and weapons were then handed over to the Lebanese Army. The French unit could not explain why they behaved unilaterally. Their ambassador to the UN said the civilian attack "was not spontaneous". Many troops, including the Finnish, Irish, Qataris and Indonesians pulled out of UNIFIL in 2007–2008. Some of these nations had been there for over 30 years (the Irish and Finnish), and one of the reasons for the withdrawal was reportedly concerns about the changing rules of engagement following the arrival of NATO forces in August 2006 and because of high-level German and French statements expressing unlimited support to the Israeli side.

At the request of the United Nations, 7,000 additional Lebanese soldiers were deployed to South Lebanon as approved by the Lebanese Cabinet.

UNIFIL force in 2010 Israel–Lebanon border clash 

The 2010 Israel–Lebanon border clash occurred on 3 August 2010. It was the deadliest incident along the border since the devastating 2006 Lebanon War. The UN force stationed in southern Lebanon urged "maximum restraint" following the clashes along the so-called Blue Line, a UN-drawn border separating Lebanon from Israel. UNIFIL peacekeepers were in the area where the clashes took place. United Nations peacekeepers tried to hold off the routine Israeli tree-pruning that led to a deadly border clash with Lebanese soldiers. An Indonesian UN battalion was on the scene, and they did their best to try to prevent it, but they were unable to.

Indonesian peacekeepers tried to no avail to calm the situation before the clashes erupted. However, the fighting increasingly intensified, so the small contingent of UNIFIL forces was ordered to retreat or find cover then report back to the base. The Indonesian contingent, under intense small arms fire and shelling between the two opposing forces, retreated and returned to their base, but two soldiers fell behind and briefly became isolated before the stunned and exhausted soldiers were helped by some locals.

UN peacekeepers did not escape the confrontation unscathed. Local TV reported that in some cases, villagers attempted to block UNIFIL vehicles from fleeing the combat zone, demanding that they return and fight. However, current and former UNIFIL officials said that at that point in the conflict, it was out of peacekeepers' hands. One former UNIFIL official explained that he has been in these situations before, and when the opposing sides are determined to shoot each other, there is nothing UNIFIL force can do. Regarding concerns about UNIFIL's neutrality, a former UNIFIL commander highlighted the importance of perception, stating that if UNIFIL forces intervened to protect IDF, UNIFIL would be accused by Hezbollah or the Lebanese people of protecting the Israelis. On the other hand, if UNIFIL forces were seen to favour the Lebanese, Israel would accuse UNIFIL of collaborating with Hezbollah.

Post-2006 deployment 

Post 2006, UNIFIL was deployed throughout Southern Lebanon (south of the Litani River) and primarily along the United Nations-drawn Blue Line, the border between Israel and Lebanon.  Since then, the force's activities have centered around monitoring military activity between Hezbollah and the Israeli Defense Forces with the aim of reducing tensions and allaying tension along the border. UNIFIL has also played an important role in clearing landmines, assisting displaced persons and providing humanitarian assistance to civilians in the underdeveloped region of Southern Lebanon. Under UN Security Council Resolution 1701, which passed as a result of the 2006 Lebanon War, its mandate and rules of engagement changed. The mandate changed to allow up to 15,000 personnel in order to assist the Lebanese Armed Forces in deploying in Southern Lebanon to implement the Lebanese government's sovereignty. The rules of engagement changed to allow the troops to open fire in certain cases: mostly in cases of self-defense but also in order to protect civilians, UN personnel and facilities. The new resolution states that UNIFIL can "take all the necessary action in areas of deployment of its forces, and as it deems with its capabilities, to ensure that its area of operations is not utilized for hostile activities of any kind."
On 27 August 2006, United Nations Secretary-General Kofi Annan said that UNIFIL would not intercept arms shipments from Syria, unless requested to do so by Lebanon.

Maritime Task Force 

The Maritime Task Force (MTF) is the naval component of the United Nations Interim Force in Lebanon (UNIFIL). As of February 2012, the MTF is under the command of
Rear Admiral Wagner Lopes de Moraes Zamith of Brazil. The Brazilian frigate Constituição  is the flagship of the fleet comprising vessels from Brazil, Bangladesh, Germany, Greece, Indonesia and Turkey. After the 2006 Lebanon War, the UNIFIL Maritime Task Force (MTF) was established to assist the Lebanese Naval Forces in preventing the smuggling of illegal shipments in general and armament shipments in particular. With its establishment in October 2006, the force was led by the German Navy which was also the major contributor to the force. The Germans lead the MTF up until 29 February 2008 when they passed control over to EUROMARFOR – a force made up of ships from Portugal, Spain, Italy and France (of which the latter three countries sent vessels to the force in Lebanon).

Personnel 
 

, UNIFIL employed 10,480 military personnel, including 500 women, from 41 countries. It is supported by 239 international civilian staff, including 78 women, and 583 national civilian staff, including 153 women. It is led by Italian Major General Stefano Del Col, who replaced Irish Major General Michael Beary in August 2018.

The UNIFIL military component also includes a contingent from Kazakhstan. The Kazakh peacekeeping forces joined the mission for the first time ever in late 2018. A total of 120 soldiers from Kazakhstan were deployed as part of the Indian battalion in Lebanon on 31 October 2018.

In 2019, UNSC resolution 2485 extended the mission's mandate until August 2020 and reduced the troop ceiling from 15,000 to 13,000.

Protecting cultural heritage 
In April 2019, the United Nations Interim Force deployed a cultural asset in Lebanon with Blue Shield International. It was shown that cultural property protection (carried out by military and civil specialists) forms the basis for the future peaceful and economic development of a city, region or country in many conflict zones. The need for training and coordination of the military and civilian participants, including the increased involvement of the local population, became apparent especially at World Heritage Sites. The connection between cultural user disruption and causes of flight was explained by the President of Blue Shield International, Karl von Habsburg, who stated: "Cultural assets are part of the identity of the people who live in a certain place. If you destroy their culture, you also destroy their identity. Many people are uprooted, often have no prospects anymore and subsequently flee from their homeland."

Contributing countries
, the total number of personnel in the mission is 10,180:

Former contributors

Assessment and controversy 
A former Israeli diplomat, Itamar Rabinovich, criticised the efficacy of UNIFIL, describing it as "a joke" and stating "They've been there for 26 years and since then, there have been so many skirmishes [along the border]." Former Israeli Prime Minister Ehud Olmert also said "We didn't like very much UNIFIL which was very useless and very helpless. Look what happened. Did you hear of any particular efforts of the United Nations UNIFIL force in the south of Lebanon to prevent the attacks against Israel in the first place. So they were not useful and that is why we were unhappy with them."

Both Israel and Hezbollah have accused UNIFIL of bias. Israel claims the force has allowed, if not aided, Hezbollah's replenishment of military power. Hezbollah, in turn, alleges that "certain contingents" of UNIFIL are spying for, if not assisting, Israel. Journalist Alain Pellegrini alleged that UN reports on Lebanon were reaching Israeli intelligence. During deadly skirmishes between Lebanese and Israeli forces in 2010, UNIFIL was heavily criticized for failing to intervene, with two Indonesian soldiers filmed fleeing the battleground in a taxi.

The Republic of Fiji Military Forces (RFMF) were created when the United Nations invited then-newly independent Fiji to send troops to serve in UNIFIL. The experience gained in Lebanon has enabled the RFMF to stage four coups d'état (1987, 1999–2000, 2006, and 2009) and to govern Fiji in a military dictatorship for over two decades.

UNIFIL has addressed the accusations of bias levied by both sides. On 26 July 2006, a former spokesman stated that upon the mission's deployment in 1978, UNIFIL was "accused of being sympathetic to Palestinians", as Hezbollah had not yet been established. "A peacekeeping force does not come here with pre-set enemies. There is no enemy inaudible in a peacekeeping force. UNIFIL is a peacekeeping force. It's not an Israeli combat force or an anti-terror force, as they would like it to be. As long as we don't serve their direct interests, they are going to denigrate it as much as they can."

Israeli concerns 
Among Israel's criticisms of UNIFIL are that it maintains dialogue with Hezbollah, which it views as a terrorist organization, and treats Israeli and Hezbollah violations of UNSC Resolution 1701 equally, while Israel views its violations of Lebanese airspace as less severe than Hezbollah's violations including crossings of the blue line and rocket launches, namely because Israel and its primary allies in the west consider Hezbollah to be a terrorist organization and not a legitimate political party, and, as a result of this, declare all armed Hezbollah actions to be terroristic. UNIFIL was accused of complicity in the fatal abduction of IDF soldiers in October 2000, and Israel further blamed it for obstructing its investigation by initially denying the existence of the attack and, upon the leaking of the incident's occurrence, refusing to supply videos for several months.

Prior to the July 2006 Lebanon War, Israel had been lobbying for UNIFIL to either take a more active role vis-a-vis Hezbollah—for example, preventing Hezbollah from stationing near UNIFIL posts to fire at the IDF and into northern Israel—or to step out of the region, which would thereby void the Lebanese government's excuse for not deploying Lebanese Armed Forces along the border.

UNIFIL also came under criticism during the 2006 Lebanon War for broadcasting detailed reports of Israeli troop movements, numbers, and positions on their website which "could have exposed Israeli soldiers to grave danger", while making no such reports about Hezbollah. UNIFIL's actions could have been motivated by the fact that Israel was, as a response to Hezbollah rocket fire (which Hezbollah alleges to have been a reaction to Israeli "border violations") and to the kidnapping of Israeli soldiers, conducting a ground invasion of Lebanon at that time. Israel was concerned when it was reported that Indonesia was being considered to replace Italy as commander of UNIFIL's naval force. As Indonesia does not recognize Israel, and the two countries have no diplomatic or military relations, Israel expressed concern that cooperation with the IDF, especially the Israeli Navy, could deteriorate.

A 2010 book published by Norwegian journalist Odd Karsten Tveit revealed that the Norwegian Army was complicit in the escape of two Lebanese men who were arrested by the Israeli Army and being held in Khiam prison. According to the book, in 1992, two detained Lebanese men escaped from Khiam prison. Fearing that they would face torture or execution if caught by the Israel Defense Forces or South Lebanon Army, the soldiers dressed the detainees in UN uniforms, and placed them in a UNIFIL convoy which left Southern Lebanon through Israeli roadblocks. Shortly afterward, Israeli Army commander Moshe Tamir visited the Norwegian battalion's camp, and accused Norwegian commander Hagrup Haukland of "sheltering terrorists". Immediately after the confrontation, the Lebanese men were smuggled onto a bus used by Norwegian peacekeepers on leave, which took them to Beirut.

Hezbollah concerns 
Hezbollah supporters have accused UNIFIL of siding with Israel, especially since the passage of Resolution 1701 which they view as one-sided. On 16 October 2006, Lebanon's top Shiite cleric Grand Ayatollah Sayyed Mohammad Hussein Fadlallah declared that the UN force had "come to protect Israel, not Lebanon", echoing the sentiment of the leader of Hezbollah – Sayed Hassan Nasrallah, who previously said "They are ashamed of us, brothers and sisters. They are ashamed of saying they came to defend us, but they talk about defending Israel."

Southern Lebanese reception 

In the summer of 2010, relations soured between the French contingent and residents in several villages that led to injuries on both sides, after a French regiment began an exercise to identify Hezbollah members that included searching homes, taking photographs, using sniffer dogs, and questioning residents. Residents accused them of violating private property, treating them with contempt, and of not coordinating with the Lebanese army. The residents made clear that their conflict was only with the French contingent, and that relations with other contingents were good. Following discussions between UNIFIL commanders, ambassadors of countries with soldiers in UNIFIL, and the commander of the Lebanese army, an agreement was reached under which sniffer dogs would no longer be used, UNIFIL soldiers would refrain from entering Lebanese homes and yards, and only Lebanese army soldiers would carry out searches of homes.

Generally, however, relations between UNIFIL and local residents have been good. UNIFIL forces have offered various services to the locals, and have introduced elements of their own culture. India's UNIFIL contingent has carried out small-scale development projects, operates medical and dental clinics, veterinary care for local animals, and also runs entertainment camps for children and yoga classes. The Indonesian UNIFIL contingent (INDOBATT) also gained a good reputation among the South Lebanese people through the Civil Military Coordination (CIMIC) program implemented by the contingent. This program has included many community-based activities, including computer courses for local residents, medical assistance and also technical assistance in rebuilding social facilities. The French contingent has taught poetry courses to local Francophone residents as well as French vocabulary and grammar to primary school students in 15 schools, the Italian contingent has given cooking lessons, the South Korean contingent has taught Taekwondo, and the Chinese contingent has taught Tai chi.

An official source within the Lebanese government informed Al Jazeera that, despite UNIFIL's shortcomings, the force had been responsible for regularly hosting and mediating negotiations between Lebanese and Israeli forces, helping to defuse tensions. The source also claimed that prior to the mission's deployment in 1978, southern Lebanon was far more chaotic and unstable, and that UNIFIL's departure would lead to an outbreak of more conflict.

UNIFIL confrontations

UNIFIL-Israel
On 22 September 2006, French Air Force jets were seen over the skies of Beirut during Hassan Nasrallah's victory speech, possibly trying to protect him from an Israeli assassination attempt. Nasrallah told the crowd that he had no fear in addressing the masses directly, rather than through armored glass. On 28 September, two Israeli Merkava tanks, an armored bulldozer, and a number of military vehicles entered Lebanon and established a road block 500 meters away from the road leading to Marwahin village, the IDF force asked to advance deeper into Lebanese territory but they were confronted by four United Nations Leclerc tanks operated by French troops, which blocked their advance. The confrontation lasted for half an hour in which Israeli soldiers confiscated the identity cards of photographers at the scene, claiming they may give pictures of the Israeli military to Hezbollah members. According to American and German correspondents, the French retreated, while the French commander claimed that the Israelis had turned back.

Following the war, Hezbollah was widely reported to be rearming with the help of Iran and Syria, which were reportedly smuggling weaponry and munitions into Lebanon to replenish Hezbollah's depleted stocks. Israel accused UNIFIL of failing to prevent Hezbollah's rearmament and thus failing to implement Resolution 1701. The Israeli Air Force began flying reconnaissance sorties over Lebanon to monitor Hezbollah's rearmament, with Israel announcing they would continue until Resolution 1701 was fully implemented. This led to repeated confrontations with UNIFIL.

On 3 October 2006, an Israeli fighter jet penetrated the  defense perimeter of the French Navy frigate Courbet without answering radio calls, triggering a diplomatic incident. Israel apologized after official protests from the French government.

On 24 October, six Israeli Air Force F-16 jets flew over the German Navy intelligence ship Alster, patrolling off Israel's coast just south of the Lebanese border. The German Defense Ministry said that the planes had given off infrared decoys and one of the aircraft had fired two shots into the air, which had not been specifically aimed. The Israeli military said that a German helicopter took off from the vessel without having coordinated this with Israel, and denied vehemently having fired any shots at the vessel and said "as of now" it also had no knowledge of the jets launching flares over it. Israeli Defense Minister Amir Peretz telephoned his German counterpart Franz Josef Jung to clarify that "Israel has no intention to carry out any aggressive actions" against the German peacekeeping forces in Lebanon, who are there as part of UNIFIL to enforce an arms embargo against Hezbollah. Germany confirmed the consultations, and that both sides were interested in maintaining good cooperation. The Alster'''s crew had recorded several overflights by Israeli jets in the previous weeks, but claimed that the Israeli aircraft had always stayed at high altitude. The week before the incident, Israeli jets had confronted a German naval helicopter, but turned back after the Germans identified themselves.

Shortly after the war, UN Secretary-General Kofi Annan, reporting to the Security Council, stated that there were no serious incidents or confrontations, but that peacekeepers reported Israeli flyovers "almost on a daily basis". UNIFIL commander Alain Pellegrini claimed that Israeli flyovers violated the cease-fire and Lebanese sovereignty, and warned that if the diplomatic efforts to stop the overflights failed, force might be used to stop them. Israeli military sources reported that Israel would bomb UNIFIL positions if Israeli aircraft were attacked. On 23 October, sources in the Israeli defense establishment said that intelligence gathered by the sorties had revealed that Hezbollah was rebuilding its military infrastructure. Israeli Defense Minister Amir Peretz told the cabinet that surveillance flights over Lebanon would continue in light of the fact that arms smuggling between Syria and Lebanon continued.

On 31 October 2006, eight Israeli F-15s flew over many areas of Lebanon, including Beirut.Israeli warplanes fly low over Beirut, suburbs , Reuters The jets also flew over a French position in Lebanon. According to the French Defense Minister Michele Alliot-Marie, the planes came in at what was interpreted as an attack formation, and the peacekeepers were "two seconds away" from firing at the jets with an anti-aircraft missile.

On 6 September, during a European Union meeting in Brussels, the French Defense Minister announced that the Israeli Air Force had stopped mock air attacks over UNIFIL positions. On 17 November, two Israeli F-15s overflew UN positions at low altitude and high speed while two reconnaissance planes circled the headquarters of the French battalion. French peacekeepers responded by readying their anti-aircraft batteries, and warned that Israeli warplanes conducting mock attacks could be fired on.

The IAF continued its reconnaissance flights over Lebanon, and despite strong protests, UNIFIL peacekeeping forces did not follow through on their threats to fire at Israeli aircraft. The Lebanese government reported hundreds of overflights by Israeli aircraft, and also claimed that Israeli troops had illegally crossed the border dozens of times, including into the disputed Shebaa farms area.

 UNIFIL-Jihadists 
On 24 June 2007, six UNIFIL soldiers (three Colombians and three Spanish) were killed after their vehicle was hit by an explosive device; two others (both Spanish) were injured in the incident.Lebanon blast kills UN soldiers BBC, 24 June 2007 No group has yet admitted responsibility, although the Israeli military believed the attack was perpetrated by members of al-Qaeda.

 UNIFIL casualties 
Fatalities

As of 14 January 2022, UNIFIL has had 324 fatalities since 1978. They include the following nationalities:

 Injuries 

 Compensation for tortious injury 
A verdict of Trondheim District Court in 2006 resulted in the Norwegian government being ordered to pay 1.216 million kroner as compensation for tortious injury that Knut Braa acquired as a UNIFIL soldier.

 Leadership 

 Commanders of the force 

 Deputy Commanders of the Force 

 Commanders of the Maritime Task Force 

 Personal representatives of the Secretary-General for Southern Lebanon 

 See also 
 1978 South Lebanon conflict
 1982 Lebanon War
 1996 shelling of Qana
 2006 Lebanon War
 2010 Israel–Lebanon border clash
 Attacks on United Nations personnel during the 2006 Lebanon War
 January 2015 Shebaa farms incident
 Lebanese Civil War
 Multinational Force in Lebanon
 South Lebanon Army
 United Nations
Apurba Kumar Bardalai

 Notes 

 Further reading 
 Bregman, Ahron (2002). Israel's Wars: A History Since 1947. London: Routledge. 
 Bruns, Sebastian (2012). UNIFIL's Maritime Task Force and Germany's Contribution, in: Auftrag Auslandseinsatz. Neueste Militärgeschichte an der Schnittstelle von Geschichtswissenschaft, Politik, Öffentlichkeit und Streitkräften. Im Auftrag des Militärgeschichtlichen Forschungsamtes herausgegeben von Bernhard Chiari, Freiburg i.Br., Berlin, Wien: Rombach, 480 S. (= Neueste Militärgeschichte. Analysen und Studien, 1), 48 Euro, .
 Mattelaer, Alexander (2009).  , Egmont Paper 34'' Egmont-Koninklijk Instituut voor Internationale Betrekkingen

External links 

 Lebanon, GlobalSecurity.org
 UNIFIL – UN official mandate
 Welcome at Unifil
 UNIFIL Deployment Map
 UNIFIL site with Pictures & Stories from Irelands Involvement with UNIFIL.

Israeli–Lebanese conflict
Lebanon
425
20th century in Lebanon
21st century in Lebanon
Lebanese Civil War
1978 establishments in Lebanon
Military units and formations established in 1978
Military operations involving India
Ireland and the United Nations
Lebanon and the United Nations